The Rock Band Network in the music video games Rock Band 2 and Rock Band 3 supports downloadable songs for the Xbox 360, PlayStation 3, and Wii versions through the consoles' respective online services. The Rock Band Network Store became publicly available on March 4, 2010, for all Xbox 360 players in selected countries (US, Canada, UK, France, Italy, Germany, Spain, Sweden, and Singapore). Rock Band Network songs became available on the PlayStation 3 in five song intervals through their own Rock Band Network Store on April 22, 2010. Starting on April 12, 2011, up to 10 songs were added weekly to the PlayStation 3 platform until June 14, 2011, when it reverted to five song intervals. Also, starting on June 14, 2011, PlayStation 3 Rock Band Network songs will only be compatible with Rock Band 3.  Rock Band Network became available on the Wii in six to 10 song intervals from September 7, 2010 to January 18, 2011. Rock Band Network songs will be exclusive to the Xbox 360 for 30 days, after which a selection of songs will be made available on the PlayStation 3 and Wii. As of January 18, 2011, no further Rock Band Network songs will be released on the Wii platform due to Nintendo's small online install base, limited demand for the songs and the significant amount of work each song needs to convert to the Wii.

Players can download songs (and free demos of the songs if being used on the Xbox 360) on a track-by-track basis. Unlike a song released through the regular music store, there are limitations to where the song can be used. Network songs will not appear as a song within the various "Mystery Setlist" challenges within Tour mode (except on Wii, where they are treated as regular DLC), though users can add Network songs to "Make a Setlist".  Users can also use Network songs in Quickplay modes.  Network songs cannot be played in the head-to-head modes, as this would require Network authors to also balance note tracks for these game modes. Songs can be practiced through Practice Mode, but unlike Harmonix-authored songs, which include hooks to allow the user to practice specific sections of a song, Network songs are not authored with these phrase hooks and can only be practiced in percentage based segments (i.e. short songs would get 10% increments, longer would get 5%, etc.).

With the release of Rock Band Network 2.0, creators can now add songs with harmony vocals, standard and pro mode keyboard tracks, and pro drum tracks, as well as mark specific sections for practicing and the end-of-song breakdown. Support for pro guitar and bass is not included in RBN 2.0 due to the complexity of authoring such tracks and the small base of pro guitar users/testers early on. With the formal launch of RBN 2.0 on February 15, 2011, the previous version of the network was shut down, ending RBN support for Rock Band 2.

Pricing 
Prices for Rock Band Network songs are set by the parties involved with authoring and submitting the song, and can be set at either US$1.00, $1.99, or $2.99. The artist retains 30% of this cost, with the remaining 70% of each sale split between Harmonix and Microsoft (although the exact ratios of that distribution are unknown).

Complete list of available songs 

The following songs have been released to the Rock Band Network 1.0. RBN 1.0 songs are playable in Rock Band 2 and Rock Band 3, while RBN 2.0 songs are only available in Rock Band 3. All songs can only be released individually. All songs use the song's master recording.  New songs are released every day exclusively for Xbox Live for 30 days.  After 30 days, songs are eligible to be brought over to the Wii and PlayStation 3. Dates listed are the initial release of songs on Xbox Live. Starting March 4, 2010, all downloadable songs are available in US, Canada, UK, France, Italy, Germany, Spain, Sweden, and Singapore, unless noted. All songs are capable of being changed or removed at any time.

References

External links 
 Official Rock Band Network song list - Additional information for all songs featured in the Rock Band Network.
 Songs // Rock Band

Rock Band Network 1.0
Network 1.0